3 Jackson is a suspended trolleybus line operated by the San Francisco Municipal Railway.

Route description
From the outbound terminal at Presidio Avenue and California Street, buses loop around the block via Walnut and Sacramento back to Presidio and run north to Jackson Street. The line turns on Jackson to Fillmore Street and runs south to Sutter Street. Outbound buses operate on Sutter from the inbound terminal at Sansome Street. Inbound buses turn off Sutter at Laguna then eastward on Post until Kearny and turning back via Bush and Sansome.

History
The Sutter Street Railway was originally a horsecar line, opened in 1866, which was converted to cable car operation in 1877.

In 1902 the company was consolidated into United Railroads of San Francisco which later became the Market Street Railway. After 1909, the line was designated the 3 Sutter–Jackson. Muni took over the line in 1944. Streetcar service ended on July 3, 1949, with interim diesel bus service until the line was converted to trolleybus operation on January 21, 1951.

The line was suspended amid the COVID-19 pandemic.

References

Bibliography

External links

3 Jackson — via San Francisco Municipal Transportation Agency

San Francisco Municipal Railway trolleybus routes
1932 establishments in California